Bembidion levigatum is a species of ground beetle in the family Carabidae. It is found in Central America and North America.

References

Further reading

External links

 

levigatum
Beetles described in 1823